Giovanni Andrea Mercurio (1518–1561) was an Italian Roman 
Catholic bishop and cardinal.

Biography

Giovanni Andrea Mercurio was born to a poor family in Messina in 1518. 

As a young man, he worked for the notary for the Archdiocese of Messina.  Following an incident with that notary, he decided to move to Rome.  There, he entered the court of Cardinal Giovanni Maria Ciocchi del Monte, the future Pope Julius III, as his minoribus secretarius.

On 20 February 1545 he was elected Archbishop of Manfredonia.  He was transferred to the Archdiocese of Messina on 30 May 1550.

Pope Julius III made him a cardinal priest in the consistory of 20 November 1551.  He received the red hat and the titular church of Santa Barbara dei Librai on 4 December 1551.  He opted for the titular church of San Ciriaco alle Terme Diocleziane on 18 August 1553.  

He was a participant in the  papal conclave of April 1555 that elected Pope Marcellus II; the papal conclave of May 1555 that elected Pope Paul IV; and the papal conclave of 1559 that elected Pope Pius IV.  On 19 January 1560 he opted for the titular church of San Marcello al Corso.

He died in the Apostolic Palace on 2 February 1561.  He was buried in San Marcello al Corso.

While bishop, he was the principal consecrator of: Paolo de Cupis, Bishop of Montepeloso (1546); and Filippo Roccabella, Bishop of Macerata (1546).

References

1518 births
1561 deaths
16th-century Italian cardinals
16th-century Italian Roman Catholic archbishops
People from Messina